Jacques Gennen (born 23 January 1948) is a Belgian politician.  He is a member of the Socialist Party (PS).  He was a Member of Walloon Parliament representing Arlon, Bastogne, and Marche from 20 July 2004 to 7 June 2009.  Prior to that he was the Mayor of Vielsalm. He trained as a barrister at Université catholique de Louvain.

References

External links 
 Political website (in French)

1948 births
Living people
Belgian Socialist Party politicians
21st-century Belgian politicians